Annette Poivre (24 June 1917 – 2 June 1988) was a French stage and film actress. She was married to the actor Raymond Bussières with whom she sometimes co-starred. Poivre was noted for her comic performances.

Selected filmography
 Premier rendez-vous (1941)
 I Am with You (1943)
 The White Waltz (1943)
 Alone in the Night (1945)
 The Ideal Couple (1946)
 Devil and the Angel (1946)
 Copie conforme (1947)
Rumours (1947)
 Antoine and Antoinette (1947)
 Mademoiselle Has Fun (1948)
 Fandango (1949)
 Five Red Tulips (1949)
 Branquignol (1949)
 I Like Only You (1949)
 Street Without a King (1950)
 The Passerby (1951)
 A Tale of Five Cities (1951)
 Moumou (1951)
 My Wife, My Cow and Me (1952)
 Soyez les bienvenus (1953)
 Le Chevalier de la nuit (1953)
 The Lottery of Happiness (1953)
 The Enchanting Enemy (1953)
 My Brother from Senegal (1953)
 The Pirates of the Bois de Boulogne (1954)
 Gates of Paris (1957)
 Taxi, Roulotte et Corrida (1958)
 The Girls of La Rochelle (1962)
 Diamonds Are Brittle (1965)
 The Curse of Belphegor (1967)
 C'est pas moi, c'est lui (1980)

References

Bibliography
 Hayward, Susan. Simone Signoret: The Star as Cultural Sign. Continuum, 2004.

External links

1917 births
1988 deaths
French film actresses
French stage actresses
Actresses from Paris
20th-century French actresses